The 1968–69 Drexel Dragons men's basketball team represented Drexel Institute of Technology during the 1968–69 men's basketball season. The Dragons, led by 1st year head coach Frank Szymanski, played their home games at Sayre High School and were members of the Middle Atlantic Conferences (MAC).

The team finished the season 8–11.

Roster

Schedule

|-
!colspan=9 style="background:#F8B800; color:#002663;"| Regular season
|-

References

Drexel Dragons men's basketball seasons
Drexel
1968 in sports in Pennsylvania
1969 in sports in Pennsylvania